Bikram Sob (born 5 July 1992) is a Nepalese cricketer. In August 2021, he was named in Nepal's One Day International (ODI) squad for their series against Papua New Guinea in Oman, and their squad for round six of the 2019–2023 ICC Cricket World Cup League 2 tournament, also in Oman. He made his ODI debut on 7 September 2021, for Nepal against Papua New Guinea, and took a wicket with his first ball in an ODI match.

References

External links
 

1992 births
Living people
Nepalese cricketers
Nepal One Day International cricketers
People from Kanchanpur District